Blue Collar Millionaires is an American television docu-series that airs on CNBC. The series follows different Americans with blue collar occupations who have become millionaires. The eight part half-hour series was commissioned by CNBC in January 2015 and is produced by 495 Productions.

Broadcast
The series premiered in America on CNBC on July 15, 2015, with two episodes airing back-to-back. Two new episodes premiered for the following three weeks. A second season debuted on January 4, 2017 consisting of 10 episodes airing across five weeks with Tim McGraw as narrator.

Episodes

Season 1 (2015)

Season 2 (2017)

References

External links

2010s American television news shows
2015 American television series debuts
2017 American television series endings
CNBC original programming
English-language television shows
Mass media portrayals of the working class
Mass media portrayals of the upper class